Thomas Wayne Hovasse (born January 31, 1967) is an American basketball coach and former player. After growing up in Security, Colorado, he played college basketball at Penn State. After not being selected in the 1989 NBA draft, he played professional basketball from 1989 to 2001, including a brief stint with the Atlanta Hawks of the National Basketball Association during the 1994–95 season and 10 seasons for teams in Japan.

He coached the Japan women's squad to the silver medal at the 2020 Olympics. He is currently the coach of the Japan men's national basketball team.

Career statistics

NBA

Regular season

|-
| align="left" | 
| align="left" | Atlanta
| 2 || 0 || 2.0 || .000 || .000 || – || .0 || .0 || .5 || .0 || 0.0
|-

Head coaching record

|-
|- style="background:#FDE910;"
| style="text-align:left;"|JX
| style="text-align:left;"|2016–17
| 27||27||0|||| style="text-align:center;"| 1st|||7||7||0||
| style="text-align:center;"| Champion
|-

Hovasse coached the Japan women's national basketball team at the 2020 Olympics.

References

External links
 

1967 births
Living people
Alvark Tokyo players
American expatriate basketball people in Japan
American expatriate basketball people in Portugal
American men's basketball players
American women's basketball coaches
Atlanta Hawks players
Basketball coaches from Colorado
Basketball players from Colorado
Japanese Olympic coaches
Kawasaki Brave Thunders players
Penn State Nittany Lions basketball players
People from Durango, Colorado
Pittsburgh Piranhas players
Small forwards
Undrafted National Basketball Association players